Dealers in Death is a 1934 documentary film on the defense industry. It implied that the First World War was fought for the benefit of arms dealers such as Basil Zaharoff and claims that moves toward rearmament and war in the mid-1930s were prompted by the same interests.

It was narrated by Basil Ruysdael.

External links 

1934 documentary films
1934 films
Documentary films about World War I